Zahorulko or Zagorulko is a gender-neutral Ukrainian surname. Notable people with the surname include:

Artur Zahorulko (born 1993), Ukrainian football player
Yevgeniy Zagorulko (1942–2021), Russian high jump coach

Ukrainian-language surnames